Robert Galloway and Denis Kudla were the defending champions but chose not to defend their title.

Roberto Maytín and Fernando Romboli won the title after defeating Thai-Son Kwiatkowski and Noah Rubin 6–2, 4–6, [10–7] in the final.

Seeds

Draw

References

External links
 Main draw

Tallahassee Tennis Challenger - Doubles
2019 Doubles